Hartvig Nielsen (1 April 1908 – unknown) was a Danish chess player, Danish Chess Championship medalist (1941).

Biography
From the late 1930s to the late 1950s, Hartvig Nielsen was one of the leading Danish chess players. He won silver medal in Danish Chess Championships in 1941.

Hartvig Nielsen played for Denmark in the unofficial Chess Olympiad:
 In 1936, at second reserve board in the 3rd unofficial Chess Olympiad in Munich (+2, =0, -3).

Hartvig Nielsen played for Denmark in the Chess Olympiad:
 In 1950, at reserve board in the 9th Chess Olympiad in Dubrovnik (+3, =1, -6).

References

External links

Hartvig Nielsen chess games at 365chess.com

1908 births
Year of death missing
Danish chess players
Chess Olympiad competitors